The following represents the golfers who have won five or more tournaments in a season on the European Tour.

Note: Tiger Woods won five European Tour sanctioned events as a non-member in 2006: two majors, two World Golf Championships, and the Dubai Desert Classic.

See also
Most PGA Tour wins in a year

References

Europear Tour, year
European Tour